Mycetophilini is a tribe of fungus gnats in the family Mycetophilidae. There are about 8 genera and at least 220 described species in Mycetophilini.

Genera
These eight genera belong to the tribe Mycetophilini:
 Dynatosoma i c g
 Epicypta Winnertz, 1863 i c g b
 Macrobrachius i c g
 Mycetophila i g b
 Phronia Winnertz, 1863 i c g b
 Sceptonia Winnertz, 1863 i g b
 Trichonta Winnertz, 1863 i c g b
 Zygomyia Winnertz, 1863 i c g b
Data sources: i = ITIS, c = Catalogue of Life, g = GBIF, b = Bugguide.net

References

Further reading

External links

 
 

Mycetophilidae
Nematocera tribes